Established in 1978, the Surigao Education Center is a private, non-sectarian, non-stock school.

Surigao Education Center is located at Km2. National Highway, Surigao City, Philippines.

History
 
Surigao Education Center is a non-stock, non-profit private, non-sectarian educational institution incorporated under the laws of the Republic on November 25, 1987.

The school was then known as Surigao Medical Center School of Midwifery when it opened as the first Midwifery School in Surigao in 1978. Ten years later, the school changed its name to Surigao Education Center and began to offer new courses as part of the school development plan. The one-year Health Aide course and Pre School Education were initially offered.

The Nursing Program together with other new courses was initiated on October 23, 1991.

In the school year of 1993-1994, Surigao Education Center opened its Bachelor of Science in Nursing program, Bachelor of Science in Marine Transportation, Basic Seaman Course (now called Able Seafarer Deck & Able Seafarer Engine) and Associate in Radiologic Technology, now offered as Bachelor of Science in Radiologic Technology.

Then, in the school year of 1996-1997, the school pioneered again in opening courses in Engineering leading to the degrees of Bachelor of Science in Mechanical and Electrical Engineering, Marine Engineering and Architecture.  Other course offerings followed such as Bachelor of Science in Accountancy and Business Administration, Bachelor of Science in Computer Science, Bachelor of Science in Information Technology. 

At present, Surigao Education Center has expanded its course offerings to include Bachelor in Elementary Education, Bachelor in Secondary Education, Bachelor of Science in Hotel and Restaurant Management, Bachelor of Science in Civil Engineering, Bachelor of Science in Electronics and Communications Engineering, and Bachelor of Science in Midwifery. Responding to global realities and demand of the labor market, the school implemented the Ladderized Education System.

The school’s eight-hectare campus includes eight buildings and a college auditorium that will soon rise.  Separately located from the main campus for training purposes is the twenty five-meters swimming pool for maritime cadets and physical education students and a Mini Hotel for the Bachelor of Science in Hotel and Restaurant Management students.  A hospital is also available for Allied Medical Sciences students’ clinical experience.

Academic programs

UNDERGRADUATE PROGRAMS

COLLEGE OF MARITIME EDUCATION

 Bachelor of Science in Marine Transportation 

COLLEGE OF ALLIED MEDICAL SCIENCES 

 Bachelor of Science in Nursing 
 Bachelor of Science in Radiologic Technology 
 Bachelor of Science in Midwifery 

COLLEGE OF ENGINEERING AND ARCHITECTURE 

 Bachelor of Science in Civil Engineering 
 Bachelor of Science in Mechanical Engineering 
 Bachelor of Science in Electrical Engineering 
 Bachelor of Science in Electronics and Communication Engineering 
 Bachelor of Science in Architecture 

COLLEGE OF BUSINESS EDUCATION 

 Bachelor of Science in Accountancy 
 Bachelor of Science in Accounting Technology 
 Bachelor of Science in Business Administration 
 Major in Marketing Management 
 Major in Human Resources Management 
 Major in Financial Management 
 Bachelor of Science in Hotel and Restaurant Management

COLLEGE OF INFORMATION TECHNOLOGY

 Bachelor of Science in Information Technology

COLLEGE OF TEACHERS EDUCATION

 Bachelor of Science in Secondary Education
 Bachelor of Science in Elementary Education

HIGH SCHOOL DEPARTMENT

JUNIOR HIGH SCHOOL

SENIOR HIGH SCHOOL

PRE-BACCALAUREATE MARITIME

ACADEMIC TRACK

 Accountancy, Business and Management (ABM) Strand
 Humanities and Social Science (HUMSS) Strand
 Science, Technology, Engineering and Mathematics (STEM) Strand
 General Academic (GA) Strand

TECHNICAL - VOCATIONAL LIVELIHOOD TRACK

Home Economics Strand

 Bread and Pastry Production NC II
 Food and Beverage Services NC II
 Cookery NC II
 Caregiving NC II

Industrial Arts Strand

 Carpentry NC II
 Plumbing NC II
 Electrical Installation and Maintenance NC II
 Shielded Metal Arc Welding NC II

MONTESSORI DEPARTMENT

GRADE SCHOOL DEPARTMENT

Campus

The college’s eight-hectare campus includes eight buildings and a college auditorium that will soon rise. Separate from the main campus for training purposes is the 25-meter swimming pool for maritime cadets and physical education students and a mini-hotel for the hotel and restaurant management students. A hospital is available for allied medical science student’s clinical experience.

Officers and administration

Surigao Education Center is under the general management of the Board of Trustees; the President has the immediate authority in all matters and is responsible for the successful management of the institution.

Directly under the President are the Research Planning Officer, Quality Management Representative, Vice President for Administration, Vice President for Academics and Vice President for Finance and external Affairs Officer

The Quality Management Representative directly reports to the President and serves as the Management Representative responsible for identifying verification requirements and recommends provisions of adequate resources in the quality system for inspection, testing and monitoring of the School’s education processes and for auditing the quality system.

The Research Planning Officer also reports directly to the President and has no direct supervision over any of the staff. He plans and develops marketing strategies for the Institution in coordination with the VP Academic.

The VP Administration ensures smooth day-to-day operations of the Administrative Department and all other activities related to Administrative functions. He manages all Auxiliary service Officer and the Head for the Plant, Property and Equipment of the school.

The VP Academic is in charge of the overall management of the delivery of quality education processes of the institution. He oversees the Academic Deans/Department Heads/Principal of all departments: Basic Education Department, College of Maritime Studies, College of Allied Medical, College of Business Education, College of Information Technology, College of Teacher Education, College of Engineering & Architecture. The Registrar and Librarian are academic non teaching staff directly responsible to the VP- Academics and who are involved to serve student needs.

The External Affairs Officer manages the linkages with local, national and international organizations, foundations and alumni. He is also responsible for planning, organizing and coordinating of all programs, services and operations outside the SEC community intended to maintain the cordial relationship between SEC and its graduates through resource-building activities among alumni.

Campus life and culture

References

Universities and colleges in Surigao del Norte
Schools in Surigao City